Armani Alexander Taylor (born April 29, 1997) is an American football offensive tackle for the Dallas Cowboys of the National Football League (NFL). He played college football at South Carolina State and Appalachian State.

Early life and high school
Taylor grew up in Moncks Corner, South Carolina and attended Berkeley Senior High School. He originally played only basketball and did not play football until his junior year.

College career
Taylor spent his true freshman season at Appalachian State, redshirting the season. He opted to leave the school and transfer to South Carolina State University in order to play basketball. After spending two seasons as a reserve on the Bulldogs' basketball team, Taylor returned to football. He became a starter at tackle and was named third-team All-Mid-Eastern Athletic Conference (MEAC) as a redshirt junior. He was named first-team All-MEAC as a redshirt senior.

Professional career

Cleveland Browns
After going undrafted in the 2020 NFL Draft, Taylor signed with the Cleveland Browns as an undrafted free agent on May 5, 2020. Taylor was waived with an injury designation on September 5, 2020, and subsequently reverted to the team's injured reserve list the next day. Taylor was waived from the Browns' injured reserve list with an injury settlement on September 16, 2020. He was re-signed to their practice squad on October 26, 2020. He was elevated to the active roster on January 2, 2021, for the team's week 17 game against the Pittsburgh Steelers, and reverted to the practice squad after the game. He was elevated again on January 9 and January 16 for the team's wild card and divisional playoff games against the Pittsburgh Steelers and Kansas City Chiefs, and reverted to the practice squad after each game. 

Taylor signed a reserve/futures contract with the Browns on January 18, 2021. Taylor was waived by the Browns with an injury designation on August 23, 2021. After reverting to the injured reserve list, Taylor was waived off the injured reserve list on August 31, 2021.

Chicago Bears
On September 15, 2021, Taylor was signed to the Chicago Bears practice squad. He was released on October 7.

Cleveland Browns (second stint)
Taylor was signed to the Cleveland Browns' practice squad on October 12, 2021. Taylor was signed to the Browns' active roster on October 16, 2021. Taylor was waived by the Browns on October 29, 2021, and re-signed to the Browns' practice squad on October 30, 2021. He was promoted to the active roster on December 19. He was waived by the Browns on January 4, 2022, and re-signed to the Browns' practice squad on January 6, 2022. The Browns signed Taylor to a reserve/futures contract on January 10, 2022. Taylor was waived by the Browns on August 30, 2022. The Browns signed Taylor to their practice squad on August 31, 2022. He was released off the practice squad on September 20, 2022.

Dallas Cowboys
On November 9, 2022, Taylor was signed to the Dallas Cowboys practice squad. He signed a reserve/future contract on January 25, 2023.

Personal life
Taylor's father played college football at Presbyterian. He is the nephew of former NFL defensive back Pierson Prioleau and another uncle. Joe Hamilton, played football professionally and was a consensus All-American and Davey O'Brien Award recipient as a quarterback at Georgia Tech.

References

External links 
 Appalachian State Mountaineers bio
 South Carolina State Bulldogs bio

1997 births
Living people
People from Moncks Corner, South Carolina
Players of American football from South Carolina
American football offensive tackles
Appalachian State Mountaineers football players
South Carolina State Bulldogs football players
South Carolina State Bulldogs basketball players
Cleveland Browns players
Chicago Bears players
Dallas Cowboys players